The Woman in 47, reissued as The Mysterious Woman, is a 1916 silent film directed by George Irving for Equitable Motion Picture Company and Frohman Amusement Corporation. It was filmed at Peerless Studios in Fort Lee, New Jersey.

The cast includes Alice Brady, William Raymond, Jack Sherrill, Etta De Groff, Ralph Dean and John Warwick (American actor). The story was by Frederick Chapin. The New Brunswick Times ran a review of the "photoplay".

References

1916 films
American silent feature films
Films shot at Peerless Studios
World Film Company films
Films directed by George Irving
1910s American films